Association Sportive et Culturelle de la Police is a Mauritanean football club based in Nouakchott. The club plays in the Mauritanean Premier League, which it won in 1981.

Stadium
Currently the team plays at the 10,000 capacity Stade Olympique (Nouakchott).

Honours
Mauritanean Premier League
Champion (7): 1981, 1982, 1986, 1987, 1988, 1990, 1991

Coupe du Président de la République
Winner (2): 1985, 1999

Performance in CAF competitions
CAF Champions League: 1 appearance
1983 – First Round

References

External links
Team profile - footballdatabase.eu
Team profile - soccerway.com

Football clubs in Mauritania
Sport in Nouakchott
Police association football clubs